The Tamakoshi River  is part of the Koshi or Sapta Koshi river system in Nepalese Himalayas. It flows in southern direction through Bagmati Province in Nepal, namely through Dolakha District and Ramechhap District.

Infrastructures

Hydropower 
Just above the confluence of Rolwaling Chu Upper Tamakoshi Hydroelectric Project is operating since July 2021, currently it is largest hydroelectric plant in Nepal, with a power output equivalent to two-thirds of Nepal's current power generation.
 Down the river in the bank, Khimti Power Plant, which was built between 1996 and 2000 is located in Khimti providing 60 MW from Khimti River.
Sipring Khola Hydropower Station (10 MW)

References

Rivers of Bagmati Province